William B. Parnell (d. Croydon, 1886) was an architect active in the 19th century particularly in Newcastle upon Tyne, England. A number of his works on Newcastle Quayside near the then future location of the Tyne Bridge were built following the Great fire of Newcastle and Gateshead in 1854. Noted architect Frank West Rich served as an apprentice under Parnell.

Parnell trained under Edward I'Anson in London before relocating to Newcastle upon Tyne. In Newcastle upon Tyne he was located at 21 Collingwood Street.

Noted works in Newcastle upon Tyne 
 St Nicholas' Buildings, St Nicholas Street (1850), Grade II listed building
 Exchange Buildings, King Street (1862), Grade II listed building
 Princes Buildings, 1–23 (odd numbers) Queen Street (1863), Grade II listed building
 Tyne Theatre and Opera House (1867), Grade I listed building
 Phoenix House, Sandhill (built for Royal Insurance), Grade II listed building

References 

Year of birth unknown
1886 deaths
19th-century English architects